Everlyne Makuto (born ) is a Kenyan female volleyball player. She was part of the Kenya women's national volleyball team, but she was not named for the African Games in 2019.

She participated in the 2010 FIVB Volleyball Women's World Championship.  and 2015 FIVB World Grand Prix.

She plays with VBC Chamalières.

Clubs
  Kenya Prisons (2010)
  VBC Chamalières (2015-2016)
  Kenya Prisons (2017)

References

1990 births
Living people
Kenyan women's volleyball players